Navasota is a city in Texas.

Navasota may also refer to:
 Navasota (moth), a genus of moth
 Navasota River, a river in Texas
 , a fleet replenishment oiler in service from 1946 to 1975
 , a fleet replenishment oiler in non-commissioned service from 1975 to 1991